Creatures of a Day is the eighth book of poetry by Reginald Gibbons (b. 1947). It was published in 2008 and was a finalist for the National Book Award for Poetry in that year.

External links 
LSU Press page for Creatures of a Day
Creatures of a Day on the National Book Foundation page

2008 poetry books
American poetry collections